Tommy Searle (born 13 June 1989) is an English professional motocross and supercross racer. He competed in the Motocross World Championships from 2005 to 2008 and competed in the AMA Motocross Championships in 2009 and 2010. He returned to the Motocross World Championships from 2011 to 2019. Searle is a three-time MX2 World vice-champion. His fourteen MX2 Grand Prix victories make him Britain's most successful MX2 rider and ranks third in total victories across all classes to multiple world champions David Thorpe and Jeff Smith.

First stint in the FIM MX-GP2 Series 

Born in Pembury, England, Searle was a five-times UK youth motocross champion. He made his world championship debut with the Molson Kawasaki MX2 World Championship team for the 2005 British motocross Grand Prix at Matchams Park. He scored his first podium result at the 2006 Swedish Grand Prix and finished the season ranked eighth in the MX2 World Championship final overall standings.

2007 

In 2007, Searle continued to compete in the FIM MX2 Motocross World Championship, and confirmed his status as one of the best young talents in world motocross when, he finished second overall to Antonio Cairoli final standings, including moto wins at the Grand Prix of Sweden and Great Britain, and seven podium finishes.

2008 

2008 saw Searle race to his most successful season to date, as he once again finished in second place overall in the MX2-GP Motocross World Championship. He remained in contention for first place until the last race of the season, but was edged out by South African rider Tyla Rattray. However, he won the Grand Prixs of Bulgaria, France, the Czech Republic and Citta di Faenza, and also scored podium finishes in Portugal, Italy, Great Britain, South Africa, Ireland and Benelux.

In January 2008, Searle signed a contract with KTM North America to compete in the AMA 2009 AMA MX Lites series. Pit Beirer, director of off-road racing at KTM, said of Searle 'His riding and rate of progression make him an excellent member of our MX2 team and we are now excited for his future achievements in the US'.

Stint in the AMA Supercross/Motocross Nationals Series 

In his first season racing in the U.S., Searle finished in 6th place in the 250 class of the 2009 AMA Motocross Championship. He made the podium three times, finishing 3rd overall at Mt. Morris, Lakewood and Buchanan. Searle's debut AMA Supercross season ended early when he injured his shoulder at the Anaheim Two meeting on 23 January. In the two rounds in which he competed before the injury, Searle finished 7th overall at the Anaheim One meeting, and 8th overall at the Phoenix meeting.

In 2010 Searle embarked on his second season in the 250 class of the AMA Motocross Championship. But once again his progress was hampered by injury, and he finished fourteenth overall after missing a number of races. His best result was a second place in the first moto of the opening round at Hangtown.

Second stint In The FIM MX-GP2 Series 

In August 2010, Searle left KTM and announced a return to the FIM MX-GP2 circuit with the CLS Monster Energy Kawasaki Pro Circuit team.

2011 

Searle finished a strong third overall for the 2011 FIM Motocross World Championship season, behind Redbull Teka KTM riders Ken Roczen and Jeffrey Herlings. He secured overall wins at the Grand Prix of France and Europe, and also managed to finish on the podium at the Grand Prix of Bulgaria, Netherlands, the United States, Spain, Germany, Latvia, the Czech Republic, Britain and Italy. While fast throughout, he was often hindered by poor starts, meaning he would lose time by having to fight his way through the pack in the early laps of a moto, allowing the leaders - usually Roczen and Herlings -  to pull away.

2012 

In his final season in the MX-GP2 class, Searle once again finished runner-up in the championship standings, this time to Red Bull KTM Factory Racing Team rider Jeffrey Herlings. Mechanical DNFs in the first moto of the Italian GP, and in both motos of the Latvian GP, ultimately cost him his chance of taking the title. However, he still managed to secure overall wins at the GPs of Bulgaria, Brazil, Belgium, Sweden, Great Britain and Germany, and finished on the podium a further seven times, for a total of 13 podium finishes out of 16 GPs.

His victory at the GP of Great Britain in August 2012, the 13th of his career, saw him become - at the age of only 23 -  the third most successful British motocross GP rider of all time in terms of number of GPs won, behind only former world champions Dave Thorpe and Jeff Smith.

Stint in the FIM MX-GP1 Series 

In 2013, Searle remained with Team Floride Monster Energy Pro-Circuit Kawasaki, and embarked upon his first season in the premier MX-GP1 class. The opening round of the season saw Qatar host its first ever MX-GP event, in which Searle finished 6th overall. Similarly, round two also saw Thailand host its first ever MX-GP event, in which Searle finished 4th overall. In round three, the series returned to the more established climes of the Valkenswaad circuit in the Netherlands, in which Searle finished 9th overall.

On January 9, 2015, Searle announced his signing for the Red Bull KTM Factory Racing Team. He signed to compete in the 2020 British Motocross National Championship for the Buildbase Honda team managed by former world champion David Thorpe.

References 

Living people
1989 births
People from Pembury
British motocross riders